The Inugami Curse is a 1951 Japanese mystery novel by Seishi Yokomizo. It is part of the Kosuke Kindaichi series, which began with the 1946 novel The Honjin Murders. The Inugami Curse was first published in English as The Inugami Clan by Stone Bridge Press in 2007; this same translation was used for Pushkin Vertigo's 2020 edition.

The Inugami Curse has been adapted twice for Japanese cinema, in 1976 as The Inugami Family and again in 2006 as The Inugamis. Both films were directed by Kon Ichikawa.

Plot
Private detective Kosuke Kindaichi is summoned to a remote part of Japan by one of the attorneys of a rich businessman who has recently died. The attorney is distraught because he believes that the dead man's will is sure to set off a ferocious battle amongst his heirs, most of whom hate each other. Almost immediately after Kindaichi's arrival the lawyer is murdered, and the detective soon finds himself enmeshed in the family's history of bitterness and deceit as more bodies begin  to pile up.

References

1951 novels
20th-century Japanese novels
Japanese mystery novels
Stone Bridge Press books